Ashton House, also known as the Ashton residence, is a Ward Wellington Ward-designed home built in 1913 in Syracuse, New York. It was listed on the National Register of Historic Places as part of the Architecture of Ward Wellington Ward in Syracuse MPS in 1997.

Features include a wraparound porch, a Mercer tile fireplace and a Keck studio stained glass interior window.

It is located at 301 Salt Springs Road in the Salt Springs neighborhood of Syracuse.

References

Houses in Syracuse, New York
National Register of Historic Places in Syracuse, New York
Houses on the National Register of Historic Places in New York (state)
Houses completed in 1913